Admiral Edward Leigh Stuart King CB, MVO (22 February 1889 – 8 May 1971) was a British naval officer.

Family and education
King was the eldest son of Charles James Stuart King, a schoolmaster and footballer, and Violet Maud Hankin. He was the brother of Sir Charles John Stuart King and Sir Geoffrey Stuart King.

He was born in Windom, Minnesota.

Career

King began his Royal Navy career on 15 May 1901. He was awarded the Beaufort and Wharton testimonials in 1909 and the Ronnald Megaw memorial prize for 1909–1910.

Having been promoted to the rank of Lieutenant-Commander in 1916, he succeeded Sidney Bailey as gunnery officer of HMS Erin. At the end of the First World War he became gunnery officer of HMS Warspite and was promoted to the rank of Commander in 1919.

In 1936 King was appointed to command HMS Queen Elizabeth and oversaw the start of its refit the following year. He then commanded HMS Despatch from 1937 to 1938 and became a Rear-Admiral in 1938.

During the Second World War, he commanded the 15th Cruiser Squadron from July 1940 to October 1941, when it saw action during the Battle of Crete in May 1941. He was also a Lord Commissioner of Admiralty and Assistant Chief of the Naval Staff (U boat and Trade) from 1941 to 1942.

King became a Vice-Admiral in 1941. Following his initial retirement in 1944, he was made an Admiral in 1944 and retired again in 1946.

Recognition
King was made a CB and MVO in recognition of his naval service.

References

External links

1889 births
1971 deaths
Companions of the Order of the Bath
Members of the Royal Victorian Order
Lords of the Admiralty